LUnix, short for "Little Unix", is a Unix-like multi-tasking operating system designed to run natively on the Commodore 64 and Commodore 128 home computer systems. It supports TCP/IP networking (SLIP or PPP using an RS-232 interface). Unlike most Unix-like systems, LUnix is written in 6502 assembly language instead of C.

The first version of LUnix was released in 1993; the current version 0.21 dates from 2004. Amongst others, it supports preemptive multitasking, Unix pipes, a variety of protocols like TCP/IP, SLIP, PPP and RS-232, dynamic memory management and virtual consoles. It contains a web server and clients for telnet, POP3 and FTP and can act as a terminal or terminal server over RS-232.

LUnix was developed by Daniel Dallmann and contributed by Ilker Ficicilar, Stefan Haubenthal, Maciej Witkowiak and Paul Gardner-Stephen in late 1990s. The first generation LUnix had support for faster RS-232 via clever software tricks, 80 column VIC and VDC screen support, PS/2 keyboard support, and small set of standard Unix commands. It is possible with this first distribution to attach two keyboards and two monitors and one RS-232 terminal to set up a three simultaneous, multitasking sessions on a C128. LUnix also supports 2 MHz mode and boot disk convenience of C128 platform.

LUnix came with an extensive documentation at the time. Well-defined library calls, relocatable code support and decent memory management functions made it possible to develop software for LUnix easily.

See also
 OS-9 a multi-tasking operating system implemented in native code for the 6809 microprocessor
 GeckOS a multi-tasking operating system for the 6502, offering binary compatibility with LUnix when linked to lib6502

References

External links
 
 Sourceforge project page
 lunix.d64 download link in Ilker Ficicilar's CBM site

Unix variants
Commodore 64 software
Free software operating systems
Hobbyist operating systems
Lightweight Unix-like systems
Assembly language software
Discontinued operating systems